was a samurai general in the service of Tokugawa Ieyasu in the Azuchi–Momoyama period, subsequently becoming a Daimyō of Odawara Domain  in early Edo period, Japan.

Biography 
Ōkubo Tadayo was the eldest son of Ōkubo Tadakazu, a hereditary retainer of the Tokugawa clan. He was born in what is now part of the city of Okazaki in Mikawa Province. Tadayo contributed in the Battle of Azukizaka (1564) against the Ikkō sect in Mikawa province.

In 1573, at Battle of Mikatagahara, Ōkubo Tadayo along with Amano Yasukage led a small band of Tokugawa foot soldiers and matchlock gunners attacked the Takeda camp, throwing the vanguard of the Takeda army into confusion. 

Tadayo accompanied Tokugawa Ieyasu in all of his campaigns, including in the Battle of Nagashino (1575). 

Upon the assassination of Oda Nobunaga in 1582, Ieyasu expanded his rule into Shinano Province, with Ōkubo Tadayo assigned to managing the campaign from his base at Komoro Castle. 

After the Battle of Odawara (1590), Ieyasu was transferred from the Tōkai region to the provinces of the Kantō region. Toyotomi Hideyoshi ordered that Ōkubo Tadayo be raised at that point to the status of daimyō, and was assigned the fief of Odawara, with an income of 45,000 koku. He continued to rule in Odawara until his death in 1594, and was succeeded by his son, Ōkubo Tadachika.

References

Turnbull, Stephen (1998). 'The Samurai Sourcebook'. London: Cassell & Co.

Further reading
Mitsugi Kuniteru 三津木國輝 (1980). Odawara jōshu Ōkubo Tadayo - Tadachika 小田原城主大久保忠世・忠隣. Tokyo: Meichoshuppan 名著出版. (OCLC 62397087)

1532 births
1593 deaths
Daimyo
Tadayo
People from Okazaki, Aichi